The 2015 Atlantic Hockey Tournament was the 11th Atlantic Hockey Tournament. It was played between March 6 and March 21, 2015, at campus locations and at the Blue Cross Arena in Rochester, New York. The tournament was won by the RIT Tigers. By winning the tournament, RIT earned Atlantic Hockey's automatic bid to the 2015 NCAA Division I Men's Ice Hockey Tournament.

Format
The tournament format changed this year because the Connecticut Huskies left the league for Hockey East, leaving 11 teams. Under the new format, the top five (instead of four) seeds all receive a bye into the quarterfinals, but the fifth seed doesn't host a quarterfinal series.

The tournament features four rounds of play. In the first round the sixth and eleventh, seventh and tenth, and eighth and ninth seeds, as determined by the conference regular season standings, will play a best-of-three series with the winners advancing to the quarterfinals. The top five teams from the conference regular season standings receive a bye to the quarterfinals. There, the first seed and lowest-ranked first round winner, the second seed and second-highest-ranked first round winner, the third seed and highest-ranked first round winner, and the fourth seed and the fifth seed will play a best-of-three series, with the winners advancing to the semifinals. In the semifinals, the highest and lowest seeds and second-highest and second-lowest remaining seeds will play a single game each, with the winners advancing to the championship game. The tournament champion will receive an automatic bid to the 2015 NCAA Division I Men's Ice Hockey Tournament.

Standings
Note: GP = Games played; W = Wins; L = Losses; T = Ties; PTS = Points; GF = Goals For; GA = Goals Against

Bracket
RIT and Bentley finished tied for third place; RIT is the third seed based on the third tiebreaker (head-to-head goal differential). Air Force and Holy Cross finished tied for sixth place; Holy Cross is the sixth seed based on the first tiebreaker (head-to-head results).

Note: * denotes overtime period(s)

Results

First round

(6) Holy Cross vs. (11) Niagara

(7) Air Force vs. (10) American International

(8) Sacred Heart vs. (9) Army

Quarterfinals

(1) Robert Morris vs. (11) Niagara

(2) Canisius vs. (8) Sacred Heart

(3) RIT vs. (7) Air Force

(4) Bentley vs. (5) Mercyhurst

Semifinals

(1) Robert Morris vs. (5) Mercyhurst

(2) Canisius vs. (3) RIT

Championship

(3) RIT vs. (5) Mercyhurst

Tournament awards

All-Tournament Team
G Brandon Wildung (Mercyhurst)
D Brady Norrish (RIT)
D Matt Abt (RIT)
F Matt Garbowsky* (RIT)
F Brad McGowan (RIT)
F Andrew Miller (RIT)
* Most Valuable Player(s)

References

Atlantic Hockey Tournament
Atlantic Hockey Tournament